The Newcastle Dodgeball League (NDL) is a professional dodgeball league in Australia, founded in 2013. The league is composed of 26 professional teams, which are divided between Hunter Valley conferences, the foremost of these being the Newcastle League and the Maitland League.

The reigning premiers are the Hamilton Stags, having won their seventh premiership at the conclusion of the league's fifteenth season.

History

Formation 
The Newcastle Dodgeball League was formed in 2013. The league is played across two divisional zones, the Newcastle Conference and the Maitland Conference. The opening season of the league had 6 entrant clubs, and has since expanded to include 16 Newcastle-based clubs and 8 Maitland-based clubs.

The first season saw six teams contest the title in Newcastle: Hamilton, The Junction, Waratah, Wickham, Raymond Terrace and Stockton. The Stockton club was the first organisation to be named as champions in the Newcastle league. Foundation clubs Hamilton, Waratah and Raymond Terrace still compete in the league, with Waratah claiming a championship in 2016, and Hamilton going on to become the most successful club in the league with a record six championships.

The Newcastle Dodgeball League is currently contesting its fifteenth season.

Venues 
Newcastle Dodgeball has held a number of venues over the year, with all conferences held in central venues rather than the traditional home and away system many other sports in the area operate with. The Newcastle Conference was first held at the Cooks Hill Indoor Sports Centre. For the league's tenth season the organisation moved to Gateshead Indoors Sports Complex. The Maitland Conference is played at the Maitland Indoor Sports Centre.

Regular season 
During the course of a season, each club plays each other side once. Teams receive two points for a win and one point for a draw. No points are awarded for a loss. Teams are ranked by total points, then point difference. The top four teams on the competition ladder contest the league finals. The series sees 1st plays 2nd and 3rd play 4th. The winner of the major semi-final progresses to the grand final, while the loser of the major semi-final faces the winner of the minor semi-final in the preliminary final. The team that progress meet the major semi-final winner in the grand final and the winner of that game is crowned the major premier.

Leagues finals are played out as follows:

Rules 
The Newcastle Dodgeball League plays by National Dodgeball League rules, as is the case for all professional dodgeball competitions.

Teams

Premiership winners

Players

NDL's Most Valuable
The Newcastle Dodgeball League's most valuable player is the team that earns the most Team of the Week appearances over the course of the regular season. Team of the Week appearances are voted on by all players in the league each round, with selections encompassing the six best players from all teams competing. This award was founded in the inaugural season as a way to honour the highest performing player across the season.

See also

 Australian Dodgeball League
 National Dodgeball League
 Dodgeball

References

External links
 
 

Sports leagues in Australia
2014 establishments in Australia
Sports leagues established in 2014
Dodgeball